Ana Lucía Martínez Maldonado (born 8 January 1990) is a Guatemalan professional footballer who plays as a forward for Italian Serie A club Pomigliano CF and the Guatemala women's national team.

Career
Martínez spent seven years with Guatemalan women's football championship club Unifut, before joining National Women's Soccer League expansion team Houston Dash in June 2014. After failing to break into Houston Dash's first team, she moved to Spain in November 2014 and agreed a contract with Segunda División team Dínamo Guadalajara. After hitting nine goals in her first season she moved to Madrid-based Primera División club Rayo Vallecano, then signed for Sporting Huelva a year later.

Its main characteristics are speed, dribbling and game vision. She started playing soccer since she was very small, at 3 years old her parents bought her her first soccer shoes. The skill, energy and skill in the sport was noticed from an early age. Her first team was at age 9 in a league of the mars field, in the team "Travesuras", being the first girl registered in the league and opening the door so that other girls could later compete in that league. She played in two men's teams, with the Travesuras and with the Estudiantes where, being a male league, she was once the scorer of the tournament. His taste for sports made in the Vienna-Guatemalan College, practice athletics, swimming and different team sports, such as football, basketball, volleyball. In intercollegiate competitions "Analu" has more than 80 medals in the different competitions. She joined the school's women's soccer team at age 11, being the youngest and affectionately nicknamed her "chiquitina", got 2 goalscorer trophies and won the Austrian Cup 6 times, the German Cup and the Montessori Cup in 2006 and 2007.

At age 14 she made her debut in the National Women's League in Guatemala, playing only one tournament with the "Municipal" team. At age 17, almost at the end of high school studies, "Analu" made tryouts with the sub 20 selection and which was called to be part of the sub 20 selection of Guatemala. She had two participations with the sub-20 team. In 2009, she had her first call for an absolute team and from that first call to selection, she continues to represent Guatemala and is currently the captain of the senior team.

After her first participation in selection under 20, she joined the Unifut team in 2007, being 6 times National champion and 3 times scorer of the tournament. In 2009 the first challenges began, having to combine sports with university studies, "Analu" studied Chemical Engineering at the University of San Carlos in Guatemala and despite the difficulties of absence classes for trips with the national team, she was able to finish her career in 5 years, achieving graduation in the following two years. In the university, she also had the opportunity to be involved in soccer, representing her faculty in interfaculty, inter university tournaments and representing the University of San Carlos in international tournaments, both in indoor soccer and football. With his participation in the national team she manages to open the first opportunity to play abroad and decides to take the risk and travel to Houston Texas, to perform some tests with the team in 2014, despite not getting a professional contract, the club It gives you the opportunity to train with them for 3 months and be part of the club as a reserve player.

After her return to Guatemala, "Analu" decides to look for her dream of being a professional soccer player and with the help of some people, manages to link in Spain, with the second division club Dinamo de Guadalajara, in which. manages to excel by achieving 9 goals in the competition. Her next step was important as she has the opportunity to test with the Rayo Vallecano club in May 2015 and in which they sign for the 2015–2016 season. The first season in first division of Spain, with Rayo Vallecano in Madrid, the results in the first Guatemalan soccer player in a professional league and first legionary, opening gap in Guatemalan women's football. With Rayo Vallecano, she had an excellent season and the interest of other clubs and sports clubs has opened up in Huelva, who has an offer to be part of the 2016–2017 season. At the Sporting Club de Huelva, the season starts with a few minutes but the length of the season reaches a maximum level and becomes one of the protagonists of the sporting attack for the club that offers renewal for the following season. "Analu" takes advantage of his stay in Huelva, carries out Master's studies in economics, Finance and Computing with a specialty in Marketing and Big Data and those that end in November 2017.

The growth of "Analu" in the Spanish league is remarkable, which means that at the end of the second season at Sporting Club de Huelva, different clubs are interested in her. "Analu" after several days of uncertainty, eventually signed for Madrid Club de Fútbol Femenino in 2018, which has one of the best quarry of women's football in Spain.

Personal life 
"Analu" is the daughter of Civil Engineer Jorge Martínez and Miriam Maldonado (1960–2018), who was Professor and Researcher at the University of San Carlos of Guatemala and the School of Social Work, Director of the University Institute of the Women, activist and feminist. "Analu" is the third of 4 children, with elder brothers Sigrid and Luis Alejandro and a younger brother Julio Camilo.

Education 
- Bachelor of Science and Literature with scientific orientation, 2008. She spent 14 years in the same school, obtained the best average of her promotion and was named the best athlete. 
– Degree in Chemical Engineering (2009–2015) at the San Carlos University of Guatemala. She obtained an award for excellence in 2011 in the range of 150 credits.

– Title of soccer coach (2014) in the National Football Federation of Guatemala.

– TAFAD course for one year at the IES Ana María Matute, in Guadalajara, Spain.

– Master's Degree in Economics Finance and Computing with a specialty in Marketing and Big Data (2016–2017) by the International University of Andalusia and the University of Huelva.

– Postgraduate Diploma in Sport Management (2021-2022) by Johan Cruyff Institute.

References

External links
 
 Profile at Sporting Huelva 

1990 births
Living people
Sportspeople from Guatemala City
Guatemalan women's footballers
Women's association football forwards
Houston Dash players
Rayo Vallecano Femenino players
Sporting de Huelva players
Madrid CFF players
S.S.D. Napoli Femminile players
Primera División (women) players
Serie A (women's football) players
Guatemala women's international footballers
Central American Games bronze medalists for Guatemala
Central American Games medalists in football
Guatemalan expatriate footballers
Guatemalan expatriate sportspeople in the United States
Expatriate women's soccer players in the United States
Guatemalan expatriate sportspeople in Spain
Expatriate women's footballers in Spain
Guatemalan expatriates in Italy
Expatriate women's footballers in Italy
U.C. Sampdoria (women) players
Roma Calcio Femminile players
Pomigliano C.F. players